Robert F. Waldrop (born December 1, 1971) is a former American college and professional gridiron football player who was a defensive tackle in the National Football League (NFL) and Canadian Football League (CFL).  He played college football at the University of Arizona, where he was a two-time consensus All-American for the Wildcats.  Waldrop played professionally for the NFL's Kansas City Chiefs, and the Memphis Mad Dogs and Toronto Argonauts of the CFL.  He is a member of the College Football Hall of Fame.

Early years
Waldrop was born in Atlanta, Georgia.  He attended Horizon High School in Scottsdale, Arizona, where he played for the Horizon Huskies high school football team.

College career
While attending the University of Arizona, Waldrop played for the Arizona Wildcats football team from 1990 to 1993.  He was recognized as a consensus first-team All-American in 1992 and 1993.  He was also the recipient of the Outland Trophy as the best interior lineman in the country, the Nagurski Award as the best defensive player, and United Press International's Lineman of the Year award.  He was inducted into the College Football Hall of Fame in 2011.

Professional career
He gained his greatest recognition with the Argos, when he was a member of their back-to-back Grey Cup championship teams in 1996 and 1997, and was selected as a CFL All-Star in both years.

References

1971 births
Living people
American football defensive tackles
Players of Canadian football from Atlanta
Arizona Wildcats football players
Canadian football defensive linemen
Kansas City Chiefs players
Memphis Mad Dogs players
Toronto Argonauts players
All-American college football players
College Football Hall of Fame inductees
Players of American football from Atlanta
Players of American football from Arizona